Kristina Torbergsen (born 24 January 1987) is a Norwegian politician representing the Labour Party.

Torbergsen was elected to the county parliament in Troms in the 2007 local elections and served as Deputy County Mayor from 2007 to 2011. She is currently studying to become a teacher at the University of Tromsø. Torbergsen is a former leader of the Workers' Youth League in Troms.

References

1987 births
Living people
Labour Party (Norway) politicians
Troms politicians
People from Skjervøy